The Kangbo Yangtze River Bridge, was called Second Hejiang Bridge, is a highway bridge over the Yangtze River in Hejiang County, Sichuan, China. The bridge is on the G93 Chengdu–Chongqing Ring Expressway just 10 kilometres west of the Bosideng Bridge. It was originally called Hejiang Bridge 2 since Bosideng Bridge was first called Hejiang Bridge 1. Its two pylons are each  heigh making the bridge to the one with the highest pylons in Sichuan.

See also
 Yangtze River bridges and tunnels
 List of largest cable-stayed bridges
 List of longest arch bridge spans

References

Bridges in Sichuan
Bridges over the Yangtze River
Bridges completed in 2013
Arch bridges in China